Biospeedotrema jolliveti is a species of trematodes inhabiting hydrothermal vent fishes (particularly Ventichthys biospeedoi) in the south eastern Pacific Ocean. It can be distinguished from its family by its symmetrical testicular configuration; its uterus passing between the testes. Furthermore, it can be differentiated by vitelline fields which extend slightly into its post-testicular region; its intestinal bifurcation is dorsal to its ventral sucker; its genital pore is somewhat submedian or median; its cirrus sac is short and the caeca are large and overlap the testes.

References

Further reading
Bray, Rodney A., et al. "The molecular phylogeny of the digenean family Opecoelidae Ozaki, 1925 and the value of morphological characters, with the erection of a new subfamily." Folia parasitologica 63 (2016): 013.
Shedko, M. B., S. G. Sokolov, and D. M. Atopkin. "The first record of Dimerosaccus oncorhynchi (Trematoda: Opecoelidae) in fishes from rivers of Primorsky Territory, Russia, with a discussion on its taxonomic position using morphological and molecular data." ПАРАЗИТОЛОГИЯ 49 (2015): 3.

External links

Plagiorchiida
Parasitic helminths of fish
Animals described in 2014